Archbishop Coleman F. Carroll High School is a private high school in The Hammocks, Dade County, Florida, United States, that was opened in 1998. Sponsored by the Roman Catholic Archdiocese of Miami, it is accredited through the Southern Association of Colleges and Schools. Named after the first Archbishop of Miami, Coleman Francis Carroll, the school's mascot is the Bulldog.

Monsignor Gerard Thomas La Cerra was the first supervising principal of Archbishop Coleman F. Carroll High School.

Students wear a uniform consisting of a solid white or light blue shirt, ACHS khaki slacks, a black leather belt, black shoes, and a student ID with ACHS lanyard. As of the 2019–2020 school year, there are 300 students enrolled in grades nine through twelve.

Academics
AP Courses:
AP Calculus I AB
AP Calculus II BC
AP English Language and Composition
AP English Literature and Composition
AP Psychology
AP Studio Art
AP World History
AP United States History
AP European History
AP Human Geography
The Dual Enrollment Program is an accelerated program that allows eligible students to take postsecondary coursework and simultaneously earn high school and college credits prior to high school graduation. ACHS has two programs:
Dual Enrollment Courses through Miami-Dade College and
Dual Enrollment Courses through St. Thomas University.

Athletics 
Sponsored sports activities at the school include:
Baseball
Basketball (Men's)
Basketball (Women's)
Cheerleading 
Dance
Soccer (Men's)
Soccer (Women's)
Softball
Volleyball (Men's)
Volleyball (Women's)

Notable alumni 
Aimee Carrero, actress
Rodney Smith, wide receiver for the Toronto Argonauts
Amida Brimah professional basketball player.
Brandon López, Social Media Producer, GMA3: What You Need to Know

References

External links 
 School website

 

Educational institutions established in 1998
Roman Catholic Archdiocese of Miami
Catholic secondary schools in Florida
Private high schools in Miami-Dade County, Florida
1998 establishments in Florida